In mathematics, specifically the field of algebra, Sklyanin algebras are a class of noncommutative algebra named after Evgeny Sklyanin. This class of algebras was first studied in the classification of Artin-Schelter regular algebras of global dimension 3 in the 1980s. Sklyanin algebras can be grouped into two different types, the non-degenerate Sklyanin algebras and the degenerate Sklyanin algebras, which have very different properties. A need to understand the non-degenerate Sklyanin algebras better has led to the development of the study of point modules in noncommutative geometry.

Formal definition 
Let  be a field with a primitive cube root of unity. Let  be the following subset of the projective plane :

Each point  gives rise to a (quadratic 3-dimensional) Sklyanin algebra,

where,

Whenever  we call  a degenerate Sklyanin algebra and whenever  we say the algebra is non-degenerate.

Properties 
The non-degenerate case shares many properties with the commutative polynomial ring , whereas the degenerate case enjoys almost none of these properties. Generally the non-degenerate Sklyanin algebras are more challenging to understand than their degenerate counterparts.

Properties of degenerate Sklyanin algebras 
Let  be a degenerate Sklyanin algebra.

  contains non-zero zero divisors.
 Degenerate Sklyanin algebras have infinite Gelfand–Kirillov dimension.
  is neither left nor right Noetherian.
  is a Koszul algebra.
 Degenerate Sklyanin algebras have infinite global dimension.

Properties of non-degenerate Sklyanin algebras 
Let  be a non-degenerate Sklyanin algebra.

  contains no non-zero zero divisors.
 Non-degenerate Sklyanin algebras are Noetherian.
  is Koszul.
 Non-degenerate Sklyanin algebras are Artin-Schelter  regular. Therefore, they have global dimension 3 and Gelfand–Kirillov dimension 3.
There exists a normal central element in every non-degenerate Sklyanin algebra.

Examples

Degenerate Sklyanin algebras 
The subset  consists of 12 points on the projective plane, which give rise to 12 expressions of degenerate Sklyanin algebras. However, some of these are isomorphic and there exists a classification of degenerate Sklyanin algebras into two different cases. Let  be a degenerate Sklyanin algebra.

These two cases are Zhang twists of each other and therefore have many properties in common.

Non-degenerate Sklyanin algebras 
The commutative polynomial ring  is isomorphic to the non-degenerate Sklyanin algebra  and is therefore an example of a non-degenerate Sklyanin algebra.

Point modules 
The study of point modules is a useful tool which can be used much more widely than just for Sklyanin algebras. Point modules are a way of finding projective geometry in the underlying structure of noncommutative graded rings. Originally, the study of point modules was applied to show some of the properties of non-degenerate Sklyanin algebras. For example to find their Hilbert series and determine that non-degenerate Sklyanin algebras do not contain zero divisors.

Non-degenerate Sklyanin algebras 
If the parameters  do not satisfy those constraints, the point modules of any non-degenerate Sklyanin algebra are still parametrised by a closed projective variety on the projective plane.

Degenerate Sklyanin algebras 
The point modules of degenerate Sklyanin algebras are not parametrised by a projective variety.

References 

Algebra